Robert E. Romano (January 27, 1905–September 7, 1956) was an American politician and lawyer.

Romano was born in Chicago, Illinois. He went to St. Patrick Grammar School and to St. Ignatius College Prep in Chicago. He served in the United States Army Air Corps during World War II. Romano went to the University of Michigan and the DePaul University College of Law. He was admitted to the Illinois bar and practiced law in Chicago. Romano was involved with the Democratic Party. He served in the Illinois House of Representatives from 1951 until his death in 1956. Romano died at his hotel apartment in Chicago, Illinois from a spleen ailment.

Notes

External links

1905 births
1956 deaths
Lawyers from Chicago
Politicians from Chicago
Military personnel from Illinois
University of Michigan alumni
DePaul University College of Law alumni
St. Ignatius College Prep alumni
Democratic Party members of the Illinois House of Representatives
20th-century American politicians
20th-century American lawyers